Tamer Abdel Hamid (born 27 October 1975) is an Egyptian retired footballer who played as a defensive midfielder.

Career statistics

International

International goals
Scores and results list Egypt's goal tally first.

Honours 
Zamalek
 Egyptian Premier League: 2000–01, 2002–03, 2003–04
 Egypt Cup: 2001–02, 2007–08
 Egyptian Super Cup: 2001, 2002
 CAF Champions League: 2002
 CAF Super Cup: 2003
 UAFA Club Cup: 2003
 Saudi-Egyptian Super Cup: 2003

External links

Zamalek SC players
Egyptian footballers
1975 births
Living people
2004 African Cup of Nations players
People from Mansoura, Egypt
Egyptian Premier League players
Association football midfielders
Egypt international footballers